Johannes Soodla (14 January 1897 in Kudina Parish, (now in Palamuse Parish) – 16 May 1965) was an Estonian military officer during World War I, Estonian War of Independence and World War II, serving in Kuperjanov's Partisan Battalion and the 20th Waffen Grenadier Division of the SS (1st Estonian). In 1944 he was promoted to Brigadeführer, which was the highest rank ascribed to any Estonian officer in the German army during World War II.

In 1916 Soodla was mobilized in the Russian Army and was sent to a military school in Gatchina. He fought in World War I. In the Estonian War of Independence Soodla fought along with Julius Kuperjanov in the same unit. Soodla was a company commander. He fought in all the toughest battles in the war including the Battle of Paju where he took command of the battalion after Kuperjanov was wounded. After the war, the Estonian Cross of Liberty was awarded to Soodla. From 1920 to 1940 he served in the Estonian Army until released by Soviet Army in 1941.

Soodla then went to Germany returning to Estonia in the summer of same year with German Army. Soodla headed both the Estonian police and Omakaitse, a paramilitary self-defence organization during the German occupation.  He was promoted to Oberfuhrer and then Brigadefuhrer. In 1943 he joined the Estonian Legion and was Inspector-General of the Estonian units in German forces. In 1944 he fell back with German forces to Germany.

He was known to have been in post-war refugee camps in Germany. He later lived in Italy and in United States. He died on May 16, 1965, in Goslar, Germany.

The Estonian International Commission for the Investigation of Crimes Against Humanity concluded that by the virtue of his senior position, Johannes Soodla shared responsibility
with the German authorities for all criminal actions carried out in
Estonia, and beyond its borders by military units or
police battalions raised with their consent.

References

1897 births
1965 deaths
People from Jõgeva Parish
People from Kreis Dorpat
Estonian Self-Administration
SS-Brigadeführer
Imperial Russian Army officers
Estonian military officers
Soviet Army officers
Russian military personnel of World War I
Estonian military personnel of the Estonian War of Independence
Estonian Waffen-SS personnel
Holocaust perpetrators in Estonia
Recipients of the Cross of St. George
Recipients of the Cross of Liberty (Estonia)
Recipients of the Military Order of the Cross of the Eagle, Class III
Recipients of the Military Order of the Cross of the Eagle, Class V
Recipients of the Order of Lāčplēsis, 3rd class
Recipients of the Iron Cross (1939), 2nd class
Estonian World War II refugees
Estonian emigrants to Germany